Æther Realm is an American heavy metal band from Greenville, North Carolina. Their music is a blend of melodic death metal and folk metal, with lyrical themes of fantasy and mythology. The band's influences include Wintersun and Children of Bodom. They have been active since 2010, and have released three studio albums.

History 
In 2010 Vincent Jones, Heinrich Arnold, and George Yiznitsky began Æther Realm as a side project to their prog-thrash band Sakrament. They opened for Finntroll and Ensiferum a year later.

Their second album, Tarot, featured guest vocals provided by Christopher Bowes of Scottish metal band Alestorm, orchestral arrangement by Dan Müller, and a 19-minute finale "The Sun, The Moon, The Star". Tarot was listed as album of the year by reviewers on the music blog Angry Metal Guy.

In 2017, Æther Realm toured Europe with Alestorm and Troldhaugen, and headlined Pocono Folk Metal Festival.

The band was signed to Napalm Records in 2018. They released their 3rd studio album, Redneck Vikings From Hell, in 2020.

Band members 
Current members
 Vincent Jones – bass, vocals
 Donny Burbage – guitars
 Heinrich Yoshio – guitars
 Tyler Gresham – drums

Discography

Albums
 One Chosen by the Gods (2013)
 Tarot (2017)
 Redneck Vikings From Hell (2020)

EPs
 Odin Will Provide (2011)

Singles
 The Magician (2013)
 The Chariot (2015)
 Goodbye (2020)

References

External links
 Æther Realm on Bandcamp
 Æther Realm on Napalm Records
 Æther Realm on Metal Archives
 Æther Realm on Spotify

Melodic death metal musical groups
Heavy metal musical groups from North Carolina
Musical groups established in 2010
2010 establishments in North Carolina